Orestes Caviglia (November 9, 1893 in Buenos Aires – April 1, 1971 in Tucumán) was an Argentine film actor and film director of the classic era of the Cinema of Argentina.

He appeared in films such as La cabalgata del circo 1945 and Albergue de mujeres 1946.

Much of his work as a director was at the beginning of his career in the late 1930s and early 1940s. He directed Al toque de clarín in 1941.

Filmography

Actor
Octavo infierno, El (1964)
Paula cautiva (1963) .... Florencio Peña, The Paula's Grandfather
Acosados, Los (1960) (TV)
Jefe, El (1958)
Cielo en las manos, El (1950)
De padre desconocido (1949)
Cuna vacía, La (1949)
Nace la libertad (1949) (as Oreste Caviglia)
Pelota de trapo (1948) .... Professor Guillén
Tierra del fuego (1948)
Nunca te diré adiós (1947)
Albergue de mujeres (1946)
Rosa de América (1946)
 The Circus Cavalcade (1945)
 His Best Student (1944)
Casa de muñecas (1943)
Malambo (1942)
En el viejo Buenos Aires (1942)
Maestrita de los obreros, La (1941)
Vez en la vida, Una (1941)
Huella (1940)
Cita en la frontera (1940)
Pobre Pérez, El (1937)
Viento norte (1937)
Melgarejo (1937) .... Carlos Bertolini
Cadetes de San Martín (1937)
 Palermo (1937)
Porteña optimista, Una (1937)
Tararira (1936)

Director
Mis cinco hijos (1948)
Al toque de clarín (1941)
 (1941)
Pueblo chico, infierno grande (1940)
Matrero, El (1939)
Con las alas rotas (1938)

External links
 

1893 births
1971 deaths
Argentine male film actors
Argentine film directors
20th-century Argentine male actors
Male actors from Buenos Aires
Burials at La Chacarita Cemetery